Psychophora is a genus of moths in the family Geometridae first described by William Kirby in 1824.

Species
Psychophora immaculata (Skinner & Mengel, 1892)
Psychophora phocata (Möschler, 1862)
Psychophora sabini Kirby, 1824
Psychophora suttoni Heinrich, 1942

References

Xanthorhoini